Galeodea rugosa, common name : the rugose bonnet,  is a species of large sea snail, a marine gastropod mollusk in the family Cassidae, the helmet snails and bonnet snails.

Description
The shell size varies between 50 mm and 140 mm. The color of the shell varies between an off white to a reddish brown.

Distribution
This species is distributed in European waters along the British Isles, in the Atlantic Ocean along Spain, Portugal, the Azores and West Africa and in the Mediterranean Sea

References

 Beu A.G. (2008) Recent deep-water Cassidae of the world. A revision of Galeodea, Oocorys, Sconsia, Echinophoria and related taxa, with new genera and species (Mollusca, Gastropoda). In Héros V., Cowie R.H. & Bouchet P. (eds), Tropical Deep-Sea Benthos 25. Mémoires du Muséum National d'Histoire Naturelle 196: 269-387.
page(s): 317

External links
 

rugosa
Molluscs described in 1771
Taxa named by Carl Linnaeus